Bruno Maynard (born February 25, 1971) is a French former professional ice hockey player. He is currently the general manager of Corsaires de Nantes of the FFHG Division 1.

Maynard played for Yétis du Mont-Blanc, Hockey Club de Reims, Brûleurs de Loups, Chamonix HC, Ours de Villard-de-Lans, Dragons de Rouen and Brest Albatros Hockey. He also played in the 1993 World Ice Hockey Championships for the France national team.

References

External links

1971 births
Living people
Brest Albatros Hockey players
Brûleurs de Loups players
Chamonix HC players
Dragons de Rouen players
French ice hockey players
Hockey Club de Reims players
Ours de Villard-de-Lans players
People from Chamonix
Sportspeople from Haute-Savoie